Kiss of the Tarantula is a 1975 American horror film directed by Chris Munger.

Summary
Susan Bradley (Suzanna Ling) is a teenager who punishes people who would either kill her mortician father John Bradley (Herman Wallner) or her pet spiders.

Production
The film was shot at Columbus, Georgia.

It was in development between 1972 and 1975 under its working title Tarantula with Carol Dunavan in the cast and John Hayes directing. Spider expert Jay Scott Neal provided the tarantulas and played the role of Bo Richards.

Home video 
It was released under the Scream Pack DVD by VCI Entertainment alongside Don't Look in the Basement and Don't Open the Door on October 31, 2006.

RiffTrax spoofed the film on January 30, 2015.

It was released on Blu-ray on January 22, 2019.

References

External links
Kiss of the Tarantula on IMDb
Official theatrical trailer
BFI

1975 films
Films about spiders
1975 horror films
American horror films
1970s English-language films
1970s American films